The Jamaica Archives and Records Department is the national archives of Jamaica.

History
The department was created in 1955 from the archives section of the Island Records Office which itself was established by the Islands Records Law (Law 6 of 1879) when it took over the functions of the Island Secretary's Office.

Collections
In 2007, the department participated in the Endangered Archives Programme.

See also
 National Library of Jamaica

References 

National archives
Archives and Records
1955 establishments in Jamaica